Senior plc is the holding company for a global group of firms in the manufacturing and engineering industries, headquartered in Rickmansworth, England. The Company is listed on the London Stock Exchange and is a constituent of the FTSE 250 Index.

History
Senior was originally established in 1933 by a group of former employees of Green's Economisers Ltd. as a rival concern. The company was listed on the London Stock Exchange as Senior Economisers Limited in 1947.

It acquired GAMFG Precision LLC, a manufacturer of machined components and assemblies for the off-road land vehicle and aerospace markets, for US$45.0 million in 2012.

It then bought Atlas Composites, a manufacturer of composite structures and tooling in 2013. It also bought Thermal Engineering, a supplier of high temperature lightweight aerospace components, for £22 million in 2013.

It bought Upeca Technologies, a Malaysian-based manufacturer of high-precision engineered components serving the aerospace and energy sectors, in 2014.

It acquired Lymington Precision Engineering, a manufacturer of precision-machined components, fabrications, assemblies and kit sets, for a minimum of £45.8 million in 2015. It also bought Steico Industries, a manufacturer of precision tube and duct assemblies for the commercial and defence aerospace industries, for £59 million in 2015.

In June 2021 the company rejected a $1.2 billion buyout offer from US private-equity firm Lone Star.

Operations
Senior's constituent companies are grouped in two divisions: Aerospace, which manufactures components and systems for clients in the aerospace industry; and Flexonics, which primarily supplies the automotive and energy industries.

Financial information

Financial results have been as follows:

Note: Accounts to 2003 prepared according to United Kingdom Generally Accepted Accounting Principles. Accounts from 2004 onwards prepared according to International Financial Reporting Standards.

References

External links
Official website

Companies based in Three Rivers District
Holding companies established in 1933
Manufacturing companies of the United Kingdom
Companies listed on the London Stock Exchange
Manufacturing companies established in 1933
1933 establishments in England
British companies established in 1933